Chantel Riley is a Jamaican Canadian actress.

Riley made her stage debut in 2011 playing the character of Nala in a German production of The Lion King in Hamburg.  The following year she played the same character on Broadway.

A move into film followed and she made her debut in the Jesse Owens biopic Race.  TV work includes the role of Kate in Wynonna Earp and the co-leading role of Trudy Clarke in Frankie Drake Mysteries.  In 2019, she starred in the USA Network drama series Pearson.

She has also voice acted in the Assassins Creed games, voicing Layla Hassan in Assassins Creed Origins, Assassins Creed Odyssey and Assassin's Creed: Valhalla.

Filmography

Film

Television

Video games

References

External links

Living people
21st-century Canadian actresses
Canadian television actresses
1986 births